Luke Gazdic (born July 25, 1989) is a Canadian former professional ice hockey winger. Gazdic was selected 172nd overall in the 2007 NHL Entry Draft by the Dallas Stars. He played for the Edmonton Oilers and New Jersey Devils during his National Hockey League (NHL) career. Gazdic mainly played as an enforcer.

Playing career

On September 29, 2013, Gazdic was claimed on waivers by the Edmonton Oilers from the Dallas Stars.

Playing on opening night of the 2013–14 NHL season, Gazdic made his NHL debut on October 1, 2013, and scored his first NHL goal at 2:21 of the first period past Winnipeg Jets' goalie Ondrej Pavelec, to record the first goal of the 2013–14 Edmonton Oilers season. He made eight points in his time with the Oilers, playing as an enforcer with a fierce reputation.

On July 5, 2016, having left the Oilers as a free agent, Gazdic agreed to a one-year, two-way deal with the New Jersey Devils. He appeared in 11 games throughout the 2016–17 season with the Devils.

On July 2, 2017, Gazdic returned to Canada as a free agent in signing a one-year, two-way deal with the Calgary Flames. Gazdic was reassigned to the AHL with affiliate, the Stockton Heat for the duration of the 2017–18 season. In 61 regular season games, he contributed with 1 goal and 2 points while posting 59 penalty minutes.

As a free agent from the Flames, and with no NHL contract over the summer, Gazdic joined the San Diego Gulls training camp on a try-out and later made the AHL opening night roster for the 2018–19 season. He made 20 appearances with the Gulls posting 3 goals and 7 points. In the following off-season, Gazdic opted to continue his tenure with the Gulls agreeing to a one-year contract on August 14, 2019. In June 2021, Gazdic announced his retirement.

Personal life
His brothers Benjamin and Mark are also ice hockey players. His father, Mike Gazdic, was drafted in 1978 NHL Amateur Draft by the Buffalo Sabres.

Career statistics

References

External links
 

1989 births
Living people
Albany Devils players
Bakersfield Condors players
Canadian ice hockey left wingers
Canadian people of Croatian descent
Dallas Stars draft picks
Edmonton Oilers players
Erie Otters players
Idaho Steelheads (ECHL) players
New Jersey Devils players
Oklahoma City Barons players
Ontario Junior Hockey League players
San Diego Gulls (AHL) players
Ice hockey people from Toronto
Stockton Heat players
Texas Stars players